2,5-Dimethoxy-4-ethylthio-α-ethylphenethylamine (4C-T-2) is a synthetic drug of the phenethylamine chemical class. It is the α-ethylated analogue of 2C-T-2.

Pharmacology

Binding profile 

4C-T-2 has affinity (Ki) for the 5-HT1A (5,339 nM), 5-HT1E (9,879 nM), 5-HT2A (274.1 nM), 5-HT2B (58.1 nM), 5-HT2C (468.6 nM), 5-HT5A (1,587 nM), 5-HT7 (3,829), D3 (1,273 nM), β2-adrenergic (124.9 nM), I1 (946.5 nM), and σ1 (514 nM) receptors. The activity of 4C-T-2 at these sites has not been assayed, with the exception of the 5-HT2A and 5-HT2C receptors where it acts as a partial agonist.

See also 
 2C-T-2
 4C-B
 Aleph-7
 Ariadne

References 

Phenethylamines